Senator Vaughan or Vaughn may refer to:

Don Vaughan (politician) (born 1952), North Carolina State Senate
Horace Worth Vaughan (1867–1922), Texas State Senate
Jackie Vaughn III (1917–2006), Michigan State Senate
Lewis R. Vaughn (born 1938), South Carolina State Senate